This is a list of comets (bodies that travel in elliptical, parabolic, and sometimes hyperbolic orbits and display a tail behind them) listed by type. Comets are sorted into four categories: periodic comets (e.g. Halley's Comet), non-periodic comets (e.g. Comet Hale–Bopp), comets with no meaningful orbit (the Great Comet of 1106), and lost comets (5D/Brorsen), displayed as either P (periodic), C (non-periodic), X (no orbit), and D (lost).

Many of the earlier comets to be observed in history are designated with an X or D due to not having the tools to measure a comet's orbit accurately and eventually losing it. X/1106 C1 (the Great Comet of 1106) is a good example. The orbital elements for the older non-periodic comets in the list assume that the comet has an eccentricity of roughly 1, and therefore the calculations are only approximate.

Guide to comet lists

Hyperbolic comet list—Comets that are hyperbolic
Near-parabolic comet list—Comets that have a period of over 1000 years
Long-period comet list—Comets with a period between 200 and 1000 years
List of periodic comets—Unnumbered comets with a period of less than 200 years
List of numbered comets—Comets numbered by the Minor Planet Center
Sungrazing comets
Kreutz sungrazers
Meyer group (below)
Kracht group (below)
Marsden group (below)
Ungrouped sungrazers (below)

After Edmond Halley recognized that several apparitions of a comet every 75.3 years were the same comet, it gave way to a new designation of periodic comets, with the first being named 1P/Halley. To date, there are 440 of these periodic comets, with many more on the way to getting an official designation.

Non-periodic comets
Non-periodic comets are generally comets that have only been seen on one occasion, or comets that have periods of thousands of years, to comets that are truly non-periodic, and will only come around the Solar System. The following comets are organized by their described types:

Ejection-trajectory comets

These are comets with an eccentricity so large that they only made one pass through the Solar System. These comets are further divided into near-Parabolic and Hyperbolic comets. A hypothetical true parabolic comet would have an eccentricity of exactly 1, and hyperbolic comets are any comet with an eccentricity of over 1. Most of the comets marked with an X are from the material cited here and the other comets are sourced from JPL Small-Body Database. Due to their hyperbolic orbits, it is impossible to determine where they come from, but it is expected that they are from the Oort Cloud, a cloud of icy bodies several thousand Astronomical units away from the Sun. However a few of these may be Interstellar comets

Comets observed in early times, which were later found to be observations of numbered periodic comets, are marked with [periodic comet number]/[comet name]. For instance, X/-239 K1 was an appearance of Halley's comet in 239 BC, and as such is written as 1P/-239 K1. A significant portion of the comets passing closer than 0.01 AU to the Sun are fragments of the comet of 371 BC, which fractured into several pieces on the 326 AD perihelion, which further fractured into thousands of pieces on the 1106 AD perihelion, creating the cometary group now known as the Kreutz sungrazers. Due to the sheer size (2000+ known members), and the fact that none of the group members have been given a numbered designation, the members are not stated on this list, and instead are listed in a separate list further below.

Near-parabolic comets

Comets with a very high eccentricity (generally 0.99 or higher) and a period of over 1,000 years that don't quite have a high enough velocity to escape the Solar System. Often, these comets, due to their extreme semimajor axes and eccentricity, will have small orbital interactions with planets and minor planets, most often ending up with the comets fluctuating significantly in their orbital path. These comets probably come from the Oort cloud, a cloud of comets orbiting the Sun from ~10,000 to roughly 50,000 AU.

Lost comets
The following comets, assigned with a D before their name, were subsequently lost after their discovery, and often remain lost to this day:

Short period comets

Halley-type comets 

Comets with a period between 20 and 200 years, named after the first identified member, Halley's Comet. These comets orbit between the orbit of Jupiter and Pluto, and are thought to be long-period comets that slowly migrated inwards, or Jupiter family comets that had been slingshotted outwards by Jupiter's gravity

Unnumbered Jupiter-family comets 

While Jupiter-family comets are officially defined by (2< TJupiter <3), they can also be loosely defined by any comet with a period of less than 20 years, a relatively low inclination, and an orbit coinciding loosely with that of Jupiter's. These comets are often patchily observed, as orbital interactions with the planet often cause comets' orbits to become perturbed, causing them to not be found at the expected position in the sky and subsequently lost.

D/1993 F2 (Shoemaker–Levy 9) 

One such Jupiter-family comet, Comet Shoemaker–Levy 9, approached close enough to Jupiter sometime between the late 1960s and early 1970s, and was caught into orbit of it. By the comet's discovery, an extremely close approach with Jupiter one year previously had fractured the comet into many pieces, before it collided with Jupiter between 16 July and 22 July 1994. The fragments are listed separately here, at epoch 1994/05/08.

Sungrazing comets

These comets have perihelion distances of less than 0.055 AU. Most belong to the Kreutz Sungrazers, a group of comets split off from the great comet of 1106, and before that, the comet of 371 BC. There are also several other cometary groups, all much smaller, that occasionally pass through. This list covers all Sungrazing groups, including sporadic, or ungrouped sungrazers.

Kreutz sungrazers

The largest group of them all, the Kreutz sungrazers are a group of comets descended from the breakup of a comet in 326 AD. They live up to their name, typically traveling less than 2 solar radii from the Sun. Because they travel so close, they often burn up, and it is the cause of their breakup. Many bright comets are members of the group, including Comet Ikeya–Seki, which broke in 3 pieces.

Meyer group
This is the second largest sungrazing group, and the only one with no discerned period. Further observations of this group may eventually find one, however.

Kracht group
This and the Marsden group, both are periodic, both with periods of approximately 3 years. They contain fewer members than the Meyer and Kreutz groups, probably as a result of their periodic nature, leading them to burn up more frequently. They are believed to be the parent bodies of the Southern Delta Aquariids meteor shower, occurring between July and August and usually having 15–20 meteors an hour.

Marsden group

Ungrouped sungrazers

References